Nicola Tintori (born 25 Feb 2000) is an Italian footballer who plays as a goalkeeper for  club Piacenza.

Club career
He was raised in the Inter youth system and was included in their Under-19 squad in the 2017–18 season. He was the third-choice goalkeeper on those squads behind Marco Pissardo, Vladan Đekić and Giacomo Pozzer.

On 3 August 2019, he joined Serie C club Gozzano on loan. He made his professional Serie C debut for Gozzano on 6 October 2019 in a game against Carrarese. He substituted injured Gian Marco Crespi in the 37th minute. In their next league game on 13 October 2019 against Renate, he made his first professional start. Gozzano lost with the score of 0–3 and Tintori was demoted to the third goalkeeper position on the squad as Crespi recovered from his injury. He was not selected for Gozzano's match day squad for the rest of the 2019–20 season.

On 24 September 2020 he went to Pro Vercelli on permanent deal. On 31 January 2022, Tintori moved on loan to Piacenza until the end of the season. 

On 26 July 2022, Tintori returned to Piacenza on a permanent basis.

International career
He was first called up to represent his country in 2016 for the Under-16 squad friendlies.

References

External links
 

2000 births
Living people
People from Pescia
Sportspeople from the Province of Pistoia
Italian footballers
Association football goalkeepers
Serie C players
Inter Milan players
A.C. Gozzano players
F.C. Pro Vercelli 1892 players
Piacenza Calcio 1919 players
Italy youth international footballers
Footballers from Tuscany